Take Me is the title of a 2001 British television drama serial on ITV, starring Robson Green and Beth Goddard. The series was produced by STV Studios, then known as "SMG TV Productions", and Coastal. It was filmed between October and December 2000 and first broadcast in the UK on 5 August 2001. Alex Pillai was the director.

The series was filmed in multiple locations, including Newcastle upon Tyne city centre; Wynyard Park, Billingham; Mitford Hall, Morpeth; Low Hauxley Beach; Samsung Factory at Billingham (Middlesbrough); the Cammell Laird Shipyard, Hebburn; and St. Aloysius Church, Hebburn.

Plot
Jack Chambers (Robson Green) and his wife, Kay (Beth Goddard), move into their new house on the Hadleigh corner estate – only to become embroiled in a tangled web of sexual relationships and secrets involving their neighbours, Doug Patton (Danny Webb) and his wife, Andrea (Olga Sosnovska). To make matters worse, Jack's work life has fallen into disrepair after his secretary Helen (Tara Moran) tries to seduce him, and he discovers his best friend, Kevin (Gilly Gilchrist), is having an affair with his wife. As the situation intensifies, Jack is caught up in the covering up of a murder, and Kay is left wondering who the father of her baby is when she falls pregnant. Meanwhile, Jack is forced to deal with the increasing pressure of his elderly father Don (Keith Barron).

Cast
 Robson Green as Jack Chambers, businessman
 Beth Goddard as Kay Chambers, Jack's wife
 Julia Mallam as Maggie Chambers, Jack and Kay's daughter
 Danny Webb as Doug Patton, Jack and Kay's neighbour
 Olga Sosnovska as Andrea Patton, Doug's wife
 Annette Ekblom as Lauren Vincent, Kay's older sister
 Aneirin Hughes as Sam Vincent, Lauren's husband
 Keith Barron as Don Chambers, Jack's father
 Gilly Gilchrist as Kevin Denton, Jack's best friend and colleague
 Tara Moran as Helen Jefferson, Jack's colleague and admirer

Episode list

References

External links

2000s British drama television series
2001 British television series debuts
2001 British television series endings
2000s British television miniseries
ITV television dramas
Television shows produced by Scottish Television
English-language television shows
Television shows set in the United Kingdom